Bapatla mandal is one of the 25 mandals in Bapatla district of the state of Andhra Pradesh, India. It is under the administration of Bapatla revenue division  and the headquarters are located at Bapatla. The mandal is bounded by Kakumanu, Ponnur, Karlapalem mandals of Guntur district. It also shares borders with Prakasam district and a portion of it lies on the coast of Bay of Bengal.

Demographics 

 census, the mandal had a population of 143,825. The total population constitute, 70,847 males and 72,978 females —a sex ratio of 1030 females per 1000 males. 13,371 children are in the age group of 0–6 years, of which 6,856 are boys and 6,515 are girls. The average literacy rate stands at 71.79% with 93,653 literates.

Settlements 

 census, the mandal has 21 settlements. It includes 20 villages and 1 town of Bapatla.

The settlements in the mandal are listed below:

Note: M-Municipality

Government and politics 

The mandal is under the control of a tahsildar and the present tahsildar is T.Valliah.
Bapatla mandal is one of the 3 mandals under Bapatla (Assembly constituency), which in turn represents Bapatla (SC) (Lok Sabha constituency) of Andhra Pradesh.

See also 
 List of mandals in Andhra Pradesh
 List of villages in Guntur district

References 

Mandals in Guntur district